Martin Jones (born January 10, 1990) is a Canadian ice hockey goaltender who currently plays for the Seattle Kraken of the National Hockey League (NHL). He previously played for the Los Angeles Kings, San Jose Sharks and Philadelphia Flyers. A standout goaltender in junior with the Calgary Hitmen, Jones was named the Western Hockey League's goaltender of the year in 2009–10 and won a silver medal with Team Canada at the 2010 World Junior Ice Hockey Championships.

Jones started his professional career in the American Hockey League (AHL) with the Manchester Monarchs and made his NHL debut in 2013, where he spent two seasons with the Kings as backup to Jonathan Quick. In 2014, Jones won the Stanley Cup as a member of the Kings. He was chosen to play in the NHL All-Star Game in 2017.

Personal life
Jones was born in North Vancouver, British Columbia. His father, Harvey, is the Vice-President of Arena Operations with the Vancouver Canucks. He has a brother, Jordan, and a sister, Jocelyn. Jones felt that his father's position with the Canucks gave him some opportunities within the game that most other kids would not get. As a youth, he played in the 2003 Quebec International Pee-Wee Hockey Tournament with a minor ice hockey team from North Vancouver. He played midget level with the Vancouver Northwest Giants of the BC Hockey Major Midget League. Jones attended Handsworth Secondary School  and played ice hockey at the North Shore Winter Club.

Playing career

Junior
The Calgary Hitmen selected Jones in the fourth round of the 2005 WHL Bantam Draft. He joined the Hitmen in 2006–07 and served as the backup to Dan Spence for two seasons. He was eligible for the 2008 NHL Entry Draft but went undrafted. Offered a try-out with the Los Angeles Kings, Jones impressed team scouts at Los Angeles' rookie camp, and following a strong showing at their main camp, the team signed him to a three-year contract before reassigning him back to the Hitmen. He emerged as Calgary's starting goaltender in 2008–09; his 45 wins for the Hitmen broke the team record of 39. He led the league in wins, finished tied for the league lead in shutouts (7) and finished third in goals against average (2.08). He backstopped the Hitmen to 12 consecutive wins in the playoffs, tying a league record, before the Hitmen lost the WHL championship series in six games to the Kelowna Rockets. Following the season, he was named a Second Team All-Star in the Eastern Conference. 

During the 2009–10 season with the Hitmen, Jones finished with a league-best GAA of 2.21 and was named a First Team All-Star in the Eastern Conference. In advance of his second consecutive appearance in the championship series, the league named him the winner of the Del Wilson Trophy as the WHL's top goaltender. During the season, he surpassed Spence's team record for career wins, and his 16 career shutouts are also a franchise record.

Professional

Los Angeles Kings
The Kings assigned Jones to their American Hockey League (AHL) affiliate, the Manchester Monarchs to begin the 2010–11 season. He also played with the Ontario Reign of the ECHL for a time, but after posting a 16–3–0 record, .939 save percentage and 1.93 GAA in his first 22 games for the Monarchs, Jones was chosen to play in the 2011 AHL All-Star Game.
He was on the roster of the Los Angeles Kings as a spare when they won their first Stanley Cup, but did not play.

Jones finished fourth in the AHL with 27 wins in 2012–13 and was also among the league leaders in games played (56) and shutouts (5). Jones began the 2013–14 season with Manchester, but was recalled by Los Angeles on November 13, 2013, after Jonathan Quick suffered an injury. As the backup for the Kings, he did not get into game action for three weeks. Jones made his NHL debut on December 3 and earned a 3–2 victory over the Anaheim Ducks. He stopped all nine shooters he faced in a shootout to secure his first NHL win. Jones won his second NHL start and made 16 saves to record his first NHL shutout four nights later against the New York Islanders. He shut out the Montreal Canadiens in his next game, making him the first Kings goaltender to do so, and the second Los Angeles rookie to record consecutive shutouts, matching Gerry Desjardins, who did it in 1968–69. Jones then found himself a full-time NHL goaltender for the first time after backup Ben Scrivens was traded to Edmonton, making Jones the team's primary backup to starter Quick.

San Jose Sharks

On June 26, 2015, Jones, set to become a restricted free agent on July 1, was traded to the Boston Bruins, along with Colin Miller and a first-round pick in the 2015 NHL Entry Draft (13th overall, Jakub Zboril), in exchange for forward Milan Lucic. In turn, the Bruins traded Jones to the San Jose Sharks on June 30 in exchange for Sean Kuraly and a 2016 first-round pick. The Sharks signed him to a three-year contract worth $9 million.

Having his first season as a starting goaltender, Jones had 65 games in 2015–16 with the Sharks, finishing with a 2.27 goal-against average, .918 save percentage, and the second most shutouts in the regular season with six, next to Chicago Blackhawks netminder Corey Crawford with seven. Jones then helped the Sharks reach their first Stanley Cup Finals, starting 24 playoff games and having shutouts in three of them.

On July 1, 2017, Jones signed a six-year, $34.5 million contract extension.

Jones had a difficult start to the  season, dropping four games in a row before he was benched in favor of Aaron Dell. A six-game winning streak in November was snapped by a loss to the Edmonton Oilers, and even during this stretch, Jones maintained a .891 save percentage. On December 11, 2019, the Sharks fired DeBoer in favor of Bob Boughner, who wanted to give Dell more playing time. By the new year, Jones was rarely starting in goal for San Jose: between January 1 and February 13, he started only three games, during which he went 0-2-1 with 4.32 GAA and a .857 save percentage. He seemed to improve afterwards, going 4-4-0 with a 2.02 GAA and .927 save percentage in his last eight games before the NHL season was indefinitely suspended due to the COVID-19 pandemic. When the NHL announced that it would not finish the regular season, but would immediately begin the 2020 Stanley Cup playoffs using the 24 highest-ranked teams in the league, the Sharks, who had the worst record in the Western Conference, were not invited to the postseason.

Because the  season was condensed into 56 games due to the ongoing effects of the COVID-19 pandemic, and the Sharks began with a stretch of eight games in 15 days, Boughner chose to platoon Jones and Devan Dubnyk to prevent either goaltender from overexertion. On February 11, however, an unspecified injury to Dubnyk forced Jones to take over as the primary goaltender for San Jose, with rookie Alexei Melnichuk called up from the AHL as his backup. After struggling in his first 12 starts, with a 6–5–1 record, 3.85 GAA, and .877 save percentage, Jones seemed to rebound in March, with an 8–2–1 record, 2.26 GAA, and .931 save percentage in his next 12 starts. The improvement was short-lived and hindered by poor defense from Sharks skaters. By May, the Sharks, who had already been eliminated from playoff contention, were no longer starting Jones in goal, preferring to use Melnichuk and Josef Kořenář instead. Jones played 34 games in the 2020–21 season, during which he went 15–13–4 with a 3.28 GAA, .896 SV%, and one shutout. On July 27, 2021, the Sharks bought out the remaining three years of his contract, allowing Jones to become an unrestricted free agent.

Philadelphia Flyers
A day later, on the opening of free agency, Jones was signed to a one-year, $2 million contract with the Philadelphia Flyers.

Seattle Kraken
On July 13, 2022, as a free agent from the Flyers, Jones inked a one-year, $2 million contract with the Seattle Kraken.

Jones would earn his 200th career NHL win on October 21, 2022 against the defending Stanley Cup champion Colorado Avalanche, making one save in his appearance after entering the game in relief.

International play

Jones was invited to participate in the Canadian junior team's summer camp, and earned a spot on the team as the backup to Jake Allen for the 2010 World Junior Ice Hockey Championships. He started one preliminary round game against Slovakia, winning 8–2, and relieved Allen in the gold medal game against the Americans, though Canada lost the game in overtime and ended the tournament with the silver medal.

Career statistics

Regular season and playoffs

International

Awards and honours

References

External links

1990 births
Calgary Hitmen players
Canadian expatriate ice hockey players in the United States
Canadian ice hockey goaltenders
Ice hockey people from British Columbia
Living people
Los Angeles Kings players
Manchester Monarchs (AHL) players
National Hockey League All-Stars
Ontario Reign (ECHL) players
Philadelphia Flyers players
San Jose Sharks players
Seattle Kraken players
Sportspeople from North Vancouver
Stanley Cup champions
Undrafted National Hockey League players